Monroe High School is a public high school in Monroe, Washington.  Since 1999, the school has been located on Tester Road. Formerly, it was located on Main Street in downtown Monroe.

Mascot
Monroe High School's mascot is "Benny the Bearcat". The term "Bearcat" was originally the nickname of the amateur turned semiprofessional boxer. Dode "Bearcat" Bercot. In the 1920s and 30s, this boxer from Monroe fought in over 100 main event fights and won 42 by knockout. However, before turning pro, Bercot's career was cut short after an opponent put a thumb in Bercot's eye, leaving him partially blinded for life. He was given the nickname "Bearcat" because he was said to be strong as a bear and fast as a cat. The school colors are orange and black.

Activities
The school boasts a wide variety of extracurricular activities. Examples of these are the academic quiz competition teams, Hi-Q and Knowledge Bowl, and the community service-based Key Club. Monroe High School's Hi-Q team is a perennial powerhouse and in recent years has consistently made the semifinal and/or final round of the state competition. In 2011 and 2017, Monroe's Hi-Q team won the Washington State Championship and participated in the Hi-Q National Championship.

The most well-known and largest club at Monroe is DECA. The Monroe High School DECA Chapter was the third largest DECA chapter in the United States during the 1990s. DECA is a national marketing club and Monroe sends multiple students to the Washington State (SCDC) and National (ICDC) competitions every year. Monroe DECA has also proven to be a large part of the high school's community service efforts, having helped fund and maintain the Monroe Miracle League Field. Each year, Monroe DECA students serve as base-buddies for the players in the Miracle League games.

The Pep Band is known as a vital part of all the varsity home football games and both girls' and boys' home basketball games. Recently, the Pep Band received a 'Best in Category' for their participation in a parade in Leavenworth. The other bands are highly decorated, having received golds and silvers in the recent Heritage festivals, as well as the 'Spirit of Anaheim' and 'Spirit of Seattle' awards for exemplary behavior and attitude at the festivals.

Student athletics have always been a large part of the Monroe High School culture, with many of the school's championship wins occurring in the 1980s and 90s. The school entered a lull in the late 1990s and most of the 2000s. During those years, track and field and wrestling were the school's most consistent programs, sending between two and five competitors to state competitions each year. However, various sports teams have begun to strengthen their respective programs and Monroe is slowly returning to winning form. Of particular note are the boys' and girls' basketball, girls' volleyball, girls' softball, and boys' football teams. Both the boys' and girls' basketball teams advanced to the state playoffs in the Winter 2010–2011 season. The boys' football team advanced to their first playoff game in over nineteen years by winning a three-way tiebreaker on October 22, 2011. The girls' softball team took first place at their district playoffs and fifth place in the state tournament in May 2012.

References

External links
 Official school website

High schools in Snohomish County, Washington
Public high schools in Washington (state)
Monroe, Washington